Inverness East, Nairn and Lochaber was a constituency of the Scottish Parliament (Holyrood). It elected one Member of the Scottish Parliament (MSP) by the first past the post method of election. It was one of eight constituencies in the Highlands and Islands electoral region, which elects seven additional members, in addition to constituency MSPs, to produce a form of proportional representation for the region as a whole.

Boundaries were redrawn before the 2011 Scottish Parliament election, dividing the area between Inverness and Nairn and Skye, Lochaber and Badenoch.

Electoral region 

The other seven constituencies of the Highlands and Islands electoral region were: Argyll and Bute, Caithness, Sutherland and Easter Ross, Moray, Orkney, Ross, Skye and Inverness West, Shetland and the Western Isles.

The region covers most of Argyll and Bute council area, all of the Highland council area, most of the Moray council area, all of the Orkney council area, all of the Shetland council area and all of Na h-Eileanan Siar.

Constituency boundaries 
The Inverness East, Nairn and Lochaber  constituency was created at the same time as the Scottish Parliament, in 1999, with the name and boundaries of a pre-existing Westminster (House of Commons) constituency. In 2005, however, Scottish Westminster constituencies were generally replaced with new larger constituencies. For representation at Westminster, the area of the Holyrood constituency is now divided between two constituencies: the Ross, Skye and Lochaber Westminster constituency and the
Inverness, Nairn, Badenoch and Strathspey Westminster constituency.

Council area 

Inverness East, Nairn and Lochaber was the most southerly of three Holyrood constituencies covering the Highland council area. The other two were Ross, Skye and Inverness West and Caithness, Sutherland and Easter Ross. Inverness East, Nairn and Lochaber has Ross, Skye and Inverness West on its northern boundary. Inverness East, Caithness, Sutherland and Easter Ross is further north. All three constituencies were within the Highlands and Islands electoral region.

When created in 1999 the constituency boundaries were definable with reference to council wards which were grouped, by the Highland Council, in relation to eight council management areas. Constituency and management area names have many elements in common, and the management areas had the boundaries of former districts of the Highland region, as abolished in 1996, namely Inverness, Nairn, Lochaber, Ross and Cromarty, Skye and Lochalsh, Badenoch and Strathspey, Caithness and Sutherland.

The management areas were abolished in 2007, and the council has now three new corporate management areas, defined as groups of new wards, also introduced in 2007. The boundaries of the corporate management areas are similar to those of Westminster constituencies created in 2005. One corporate management area, the Caithness, Sutherland and Easter Ross area, has boundaries, therefore, which are also similar to those of a Holyrood constituency. The boundaries of the other two corporate areas, the Ross, Skye and Lochaber area and the Inverness, Nairn, and Badenoch and Strathspey area, are quite unlike those of any Holyrood constituency.

Member of the Scottish Parliament

Election results

Notes and references 

Scottish Parliament constituencies and regions 1999–2011
Highland constituencies, Scottish Parliament
1999 establishments in Scotland
Constituencies established in 1999
2011 disestablishments in Scotland
Constituencies disestablished in 2011
Inverness-shire
Lochaber
County of Nairn